Wadi Al-Ryashyyah is a sub-district located in the Ar Ryashyyah District, Al Bayda Governorate, Yemen. Wadi Al-Ryashyyah had a population of 7718 according to the 2004 census.

References 

Sub-districts in Ar Ryashyyah District